Acleris bicolor is a species of moth of the family Tortricidae. It is found in Japan.

The length of the forewings is 9 mm for males and 11 mm for females. The ground colour of the forewings is bicolored. The costal area is orange yellow, with a darker orange apical portion. The remaining area is metallic leaden, with scattered pale greyish-brown and yellow scales. The hindwings are brownish grey, but darker apically and lighter dorsally and basally.

References

Moths described in 1963
bicolor
Moths of Japan